The blue-and-white flycatcher (Cyanoptila cyanomelana) is a migratory songbird in the Old World flycatcher family Muscicapidae. The species is also known as the Japanese flycatcher. It breeds in Japan, Korea, and in parts of north eastern China and the Russian Far East. It winters in South East Asia, especially in Vietnam, Cambodia, Thailand, Sumatra and Borneo. This species has been recorded as a vagrant from the Sinharaja Rainforest in Sri Lanka in 2014.

References

 Del Hoyo, J.; Elliot, A. & Christie D. (editors). (2006). Handbook of the Birds of the World. Volume 11: Old World Flycatchers to Old World Warblers. Lynx Edicions. .

External links

blue-and-white flycatcher
Birds of Manchuria
Birds of Korea
Birds of Japan
blue-and-white flycatcher